Cedar Grove is an unincorporated community in Newton County, Mississippi, United States.

The community is located along an east-west trending ridge between Dunnagin Creek to the north and Richardson Mill Creek to the south. Newton lies approximately two miles to the southeast.

References

Unincorporated communities in Newton County, Mississippi
Unincorporated communities in Mississippi